The Leroy Keener House Owned by Thomas Franklin Hunt is a historic home located at 3506 Woodlawn School Road in Knoxville, Tennessee, United States.  It is also known as KN 2844, Fairview, Summer's Haven. and the Keener-Hunt House  Designed in the Federal style, the house was built in 1842 by Leroy Keener, Leroy was an early Knox County farmer.  It was listed on the National Register of Historic Places in 1997 for its architecture and role in the area's early settlement.

Leroy Keener's Grandfather, Peter Keener, moved to the Seven Islands area from Pennsylvania.  The home of Peter Keener, a two-story log structure used to stand nearby on Seven Islands Road.  Leroy Keener built his house in 1842, shortly after his marriage to Mary Jane McCallie.  Keener's descendants occupied the house until   the Kelleys bought it in 1913, They occupied the house until 1972 when the current owner, Thomas Franklin Hunt Bought it.

The house is a two-story brick structure.  Several outbuildings still stand near the house, including a Well House and a smokehouse.

See also
Seven Islands Methodist Church

References

Houses in Knoxville, Tennessee
Houses on the National Register of Historic Places in Tennessee
National Register of Historic Places in Knoxville, Tennessee